"Accidentally Cool" is a song recorded by Australian rock group, Chocolate Starfish, which is co-written by members, Adam Thompson and Zoran Romich. It was released in July 1995 as the lead single from their second studio album, Box (October 1995), and peaked at No. 39 on the ARIA Singles Chart in August.

Track listing

CD Single (8740762)
 "Accidentally Cool" - 3:56
 "Rollercoaster" - 3:47

Charts

References

Virgin Records singles
1995 songs
Chocolate Starfish songs
1995 singles